Jean-Philippe Maurer (born 7 July 1960 in Strasbourg) was a member of the National Assembly of France between 2007 and 2012.  He represented the Bas-Rhin department,  and was a member of the Union for a Popular Movement.

He is member of the general council of the Bas-Rhin.

References

1960 births
Living people
Politicians from Strasbourg
Union for a Popular Movement politicians
Deputies of the 13th National Assembly of the French Fifth Republic